Mount Goorhigian is, at , the highest mountain of the Demas Range in Marie Byrd Land, Antarctica. It was mapped by the United States Geological Survey from surveys and U.S. Navy air photos, 1959–65, and was named by the Advisory Committee on Antarctic Names after Martin Goorhigian, a United States Antarctic Research Program meteorologist at Byrd Station, 1961.

References

Mountains of Marie Byrd Land